The 2020 Erovnuli Liga 2 (formerly known as Pirveli Liga) was the 32nd season of second tier football in Georgia. The season began on 2 March 2020 and ended on 9 December 2020.Due to COVID-19 pandemic, each team will play 18 matches instead of the planned 36.

Teams and stadiums

Source:

League table

Results
Each team will play the other nine teams home and away once, for a total of 18 games each.

Relegation play-offs

References

External links
  
Georgian Football Federation

Erovnuli Liga 2 seasons
2
Georgia
Georgia